Rozel is a city in Pawnee County, Kansas, United States.  As of the 2020 census, the population of the city was 102.

History
The first post office in Rozel was established in 1893. The community was named in honor of Roseila, the daughter of a businessman.

Geography
Rozel is located at  (38.195870, -99.402444).

Demographics

2010 census
As of the census of 2010, there were 156 people, 66 households, and 43 families residing in the city. The racial makeup of the city was 100.0% White. Hispanic or Latino of any race were 4.5% of the population.

There were 66 households, of which 24.2% had children under the age of 18 living with them, 60.6% were married couples living together, 1.5% had a female householder with no husband present, 3.0% had a male householder with no wife present, and 34.8% were non-families. 31.8% of all households were made up of individuals, and 13.7% had someone living alone who was 65 years of age or older. The average household size was 2.36 and the average family size was 3.02.

The median age in the city was 44.5 years. 23.1% of residents were under the age of 18; 6.3% were between the ages of 18 and 24; 21.2% were from 25 to 44; 30.8% were from 45 to 64; and 18.6% were 65 years of age or older. The gender makeup of the city was 51.3% male and 48.7% female.

2000 census
As of the census of 2000, there were 182 people, 72 households, and 48 families residing in the city. The racial makeup of the city was 96.70% White, 0.55% from other races, and 2.75% from two or more races. Hispanic or Latino of any race were 1.10% of the population.

There were 72 households, out of which 33.3% had children under the age of 18 living with them, 58.3% were married couples living together, 6.9% had a female householder with no husband present, and 33.3% were non-families. 31.9% of all households were made up of individuals, and 15.3% had someone living alone who was 65 years of age or older. The average household size was 2.53 and the average family size was 3.25.

In the city, the population was spread out, with 31.3% under the age of 18, 7.1% from 18 to 24, 24.2% from 25 to 44, 20.9% from 45 to 64, and 16.5% who were 65 years of age or older. The median age was 35 years. For every 100 females, there were 83.8 males. For every 100 females age 18 and over, there were 86.6 males.

The median income for a household in the city was $33,750, and the median income for a family was $45,893. Males had a median income of $25,833 versus $21,875 for females. The per capita income for the city was $14,151. About 6.1% of families and 8.6% of the population were below the poverty line, including 11.3% of those under the age of eighteen and 6.3% of those 65 or over.

Education
Rozel is a part of USD 496 Pawnee Heights. The Pawnee Heights High School mascot is Tigers.

Rozel High School was closed through school unification. The Rozel Tigers won the Kansas State High School boys class BB basketball championship in 1959 and the boys class B basketball championship in 1960.

Notable people
 Gary Patterson, former head football coach at TCU 
 Glee Smith, Jr., Kansas state legislator and lawyer

See also
 Pawnee River
 Tornado outbreak of May 18–21, 2013

References

Further reading

External links

 
 Rozel - Directory of Public Officials
 USD 496, local school district
 Rozel city map, KDOT

Cities in Pawnee County, Kansas
Cities in Kansas
1893 establishments in Kansas